Minister of Economy and Finance is a cabinet level position in the national government of Mozambique.

Ministers of Economy and Finance
Salamão Munguambe, 1975-1978
Rui Baltazar dos Santos Alves, 1978-1986
Abdul Magid Osman, 1986-1991
Eneas Comiche, 1991-1994
Tomaz Salomão, 1994-2000
Luísa Diogo, 2000-2005
Manuel Chang, 2005-2015
Adriano Maleiane, 2015-2022 
Ernesto Max Elias Tonela, 2022-present

See also
 Government of Mozambique
 Economy of Mozambique

External links
Website of the Ministry of Economy and Finance

References

Finance
Finance
Politicians